The horsemanship of Ulysses S. Grant has been widely acclaimed by his contemporaries and historians as among the most exceptional in American history. Ulysses S. Grant was a commanding general during the Civil War and a two-term U.S. President. Born in Ohio near the Ohio River, Grant grew up around horses, which he came to admire and love, possessing a natural affinity, allowing him to ride, train and manage horses at an early age. His father Jesse placed much confidence in his ability and gave him tasks involving horses that were rarely ever expected of a youth. At age five he was noted for doing difficult stunts bareback and soon after was also performing responsible chores, hauling timber, and driving teams of horses for long distances by himself. From boyhood through his military career, Grant had a well established reputation for training and managing horses. As a youth, neighbors would have him train hard-to-manage horses. As a cadet he set a high-jump record at West Point that stood for a quarter-century.

Horses played an important role throughout Grant's military career, carrying him with dispatches, going about inspecting and encouraging troops and taking him into battle, sometimes having his horse shot from underneath him. During his lifetime he mostly owned and rode large and powerful horses that often could not be mounted by anyone else. Noted for his love of and ability to ride and manage horses, Grant at times would receive as gifts the best horses available from friends and admirers.

Youth

Grant's first experience on horseback occurred at a circus that was visiting Georgetown when he was two years old. Watching the horses in the ring, Ulysses asked his parents if he could sit atop one of the ponies and ride it, to which his parents acquiesced. It was a happy event for the boy as he rode around the ring shrieking with laughter, not wanting to get off. This was also the first time he showed signs of natural riding ability.

When Grant was little more than a toddler he was often found out by his father's shop with the teams of horses, restlessly crawling and playing about their legs and swinging from their tails. On one of several such occasions a worried neighbor once noted this activity and exclaimed to his mother, Hannah, "Mrs. Grant, do you know where your boy is? He is out there swinging on the tails of Loudon's horses!" Calmly, Hannah would typically reply, "horses seem to understand Ulysses".

The young Grant was always on hand and eager for any work which involved riding a horse or driving a team of horses. At the age of five, he proved to be a skilled rider and something of a daredevil on horseback. Riding at a fast pace, he would stand on one leg while holding the reins, maintaining his balance as the horse galloped about–a feat that amazed his onlookers. At age seven, while his father was away for the day, young Grant harnessed a restless three-year old colt, which had never been broken except to the saddle, to a sleigh, and drove the young horse about, hauling loads of brushwood throughout the day. Upon his father's return he discovered that after his son managed to bridle and harness the colt, he had amassed "a pile of brush as big as a cabin" all by himself. 

When Grant was eleven he established a reputation among his peers and neighbors by riding a trick pony belonging to the circus that came to town. The pony had been trained to throw off anyone who attempted to mount him. After several other boys tried and failed the young Grant came forward and said, "I believe I can ride that pony". He mounted the restless animal, having no reins and its mane cut short, and wrapped his arms firmly around its neck. After a frantic effort to buck him off, the pony finally abated where Ulysses, rode the pony around the ring for a couple of minutes, earning himself a rounding applause from the spectators and the five-dollar prize promised to anyone who could stay with the pony.

Ulysses' father Jesse Grant held regard for horses that was pragmatic. As a tanner and leather goods merchant, horses to him were simply beasts of burden and a potential source for hides. By contrast Ulysses viewed them as wonderful individuals, each with their own temperament. He was able to size up any horse he was working with, and possessed a temperament of his own that allowed him to best employ any given horse.

Jesse began assigning various chores which required horses to Ulysses by the time he was eight years old. He soon became a proficient teamster working all day, every day, hauling wood or bark. At ten Ulysses would drive a pair of horses, by himself, from his home in Georgetown to Cincinnati, forty miles away, bringing home a load of passengers. His father did not insist on his working about the barkmill, provided there was other available work and often entrusted Ulysses with a team of horses on his own. He also allowed Ulysses to manage the horses on the farm and participate in the farming.

At age twelve, Grant's father sent him into the forest with a team of horses and a wagon to pick up a load of timber. The men at the lumber camp were supposed to load the wagon, but were nowhere to be found when Ulysses arrived. Not wanting to go back empty handed, Ulysses devised a method by hitching the logs and pulling them aboard the wagon one at a time by use of the horses. After securing the load, Ulysses hitched up the team back to the wagon and returned home, much to the amazement of his father.

Biographer James McClure describes how the young Ulysses' "exhibited a remarkable self possession of mind" on an occasion when he was transporting two women in a two-horse wagon across a creek swollen from a heavy rain where he found the water level much deeper than usual. Upon crossing, he suddenly found the water to be so deep that the horses were almost swimming, while the water was up to the deck level of the wagon. The women became greatly alarmed and began to scream, but the young Grant, though in a very precarious situation, kept his calm, simply looked over his shoulder and assured the ladies by saying, "Don't speak I will take you through safe", and continued on undaunted without further incident.

When about nine years old, the young Grant had acquired such a reputation for fast riding and stunts that jockeys who had steeds suffering from what was called “a distemper,” would bring their animals to Georgetown for Grant to ride them hard and fast, a technique that was known bring the horse's body temperature up, curing the illness. Local farmers would also bring their problem horses for him to train. These challenges delighted the boy thoroughly. Pulitzer Prize winning biographer Hamlin Garland commented that Grant had a "mysterious" ability to communicate with horses, "He could train a horse to trot, rack, or pace, apparently at will". Grant, reflecting on his youthful experiences with horses, would later write in his Personal Memoirs:

Military

Grant also gained a reputation for excellent horsemanship during his military career, and subsequently would sometimes receive horses as gifts from admirers. In the Mexican–American War he performed remarkable feats on horseback during battle. During the American Civil War Grant owned several horses, riding them on scouting missions, while inspecting the troops and formations, and during battle. At times he would retire one horse and use another during long campaigns. Grant was known to take exceptional care of his mounts and always kept them brushed "smooth as silk" with all the trappings in perfect order.

A war correspondent having often observed Grant's self-styled horsemanship once characterized his overall military involvement with horses: "Roads are almost useless to him, for he takes short cuts through fields and woods, and will swim his horse through almost any stream that obstructs his way. Nor does it make any difference to him whether he has daylight for his movements, for he will ride from breakfast until two o'clock in the morning, and that too without eating. The next day he will repeat the dose, until he finishes his work."

West Point
At the age of 17, Grant was nominated to attend West Point in the spring of 1839. After being accepted, he made his way across Pennsylvania to New York City and traveled up the Hudson River to West Point, arriving there and signing the register on May 29. There he soon surpassed all the cadets at the academy in horsemanship.

Among the horses at the academy was a dark bay horse that was so untamable that it was about to be condemned. Grant selected this beast for his horse. Every day he would devote time to it, bridling, mounting and riding it about with ease, while the entire class would watch and admire in amazement his excellent command of this horse.

Horsemanship was an important part of the curriculum at West Point. In June 1843 the cadets assembled in the riding hall during their final graduating exercises, where all members performed their riding exercises before the Superintendent, Richard Delafield, and a large assembly of spectators. The academy riding master, Henry Hershberger, approached the high-jump bar, raised it another foot, higher than an average man's head, and then called out, "Cadet Grant", prompting a low murmur of wonderment from among the crowd. From among the cadets, all mounted on their horses, Grant sprang forward, riding a large and powerful chestnut mount. The cadets all recognized York, the horse that no one else was able to ride. Grant moved to the far end of the hall, and as he turned his mount towards the bar silence fell over the crowd. He dashed forward, gauging his pace, and with a great leap, horse and rider cleared the bar with apparent ease. Hershberg cried out, "very well done, sir", as the assembly filled the riding hall with the sound of applause. Grant had set a high-jump record at West Point that stood for twenty-five years.

Grant's personal biographer Albert D. Richardson said of Grant's horsemanship: "There was nothing he could not ride. He commanded, sat, and jumped a horse with singular ease and grace; was seen to the best advantage when mounted and at a full gallop ; could perform more feats than any other member of his class, and was, altogether, one of the very best riders West Point had ever known."

Grant's classmate, the future Confederate General, James Longstreet, said of Grant that, "In horsemanship, however, he was noted as the most proficient in the Academy. In fact, rider and horse held together like the fabled centaur..." and that he was "the most daring horseman in the academy". General Rufus Ingalls later recalled that when an unruly or stubborn horse was added to the string of academy horses Grant was always called upon to subdue it. After graduation, Grant naturally requested service in the cavalry, but despite his excellent horsemanship, there was no opening available and instead was assigned to the 4th Infantry Regiment, his second choice.

Mexican–American War
During the Mexican–American War Grant expressed his amazement of the great herds of wild mustangs roaming between the Nueces and Rio Grande rivers, moving about like buffalo in a continuous mass. "The country was a rolling prairie, and from the higher ground the vision was obstructed only by the earth's curvature." Grant estimated that to corral a herd of this size, an area the size of the state of Delaware would be required.

Grant at this time was appointed Quartermaster of his regiment in August, 1846. Because of his organizational skills and ability with horses and managing teams of horses, he was put in charge of the mule teams used by the Army. Longing to participate in battle and share in its dangers, Grant found such an assignment beneath his ability and respectfully submitted a protest to this effect to his colonel, which was denied. His new assignment involved loading and packing the mules correctly and efficiently, and keeping abreast of their overall well being. For every eight soldiers there was one pack mule where Grant would have to inspect and manage up to fifty mules, along with five mule wagon teams. To assist in this huge task and responsibility Grant would hire local Mexican mule handlers, who were more familiar with handling Mexican mules, different in their habits from those bred in America, that the Army had purchased while in Mexico.

When a volunteer was needed to carry an important dispatch for reinforcements, Grant came forward and demonstrated his equestrian ability at the Battle of Monterrey by carrying the dispatch past snipers while hanging off the side of his horse at a fast gallop, keeping the animal between him and potential fire. Before leaving the city he stopped at a house in American hands and assured some wounded Americans, he would send for help.

Civil War

When the Civil War broke out, Grant was working at his father's leather shop in Galena, Illinois. With his home next to the shop Grant had no need for a horse, and did not own one at the time. During the war Grant owned and rode more than ten different horses, including Cincinnati, Claybank, Egypt, Fox, Jack, Jeff Davis, Kangaroo, Little Reb, Methuselah and Rodney.

Grant was appointed colonel of the Twenty-first Illinois Volunteer Infantry on June 14, 1861, at which time he purchased a horse while still in Galena. It was a strong horse, but while Grant was leading his regiment from Springfield, Illinois, to Missouri the mount proved to be unfit for military duty.

While encamped on the Illinois River for a few days a local farmer brought in a cream colored stallion of considerable value. High spirited, very intelligent, the horse, named Jack, proved to be an excellent mount for long marches, but lacked tenacity and responsiveness in battle, to which Grant referred to him as "Old Nuisance". The horse was striking in appearance, with its silver mane and tail, and dark eyes. Grant often rode this mount during the campaigns of 1862-1863, and kept him as an extra horse for ceremonial purposes. This was the horse that carried Grant away from Admiral Foote's riverboat the night before the attack on Fort Donelson; the same horse that endured difficult scouting missions in the Tennessee mud before and during the Battle of Shiloh. Grant rode Jack through the Cumberland to the Battle of Chattanooga.  After Chattanooga Grant was called away and retired the horse to his business advisor, J. R. Jones in Northern Illinois, for his personal use. During this time Grant purchased a second horse, called Fox, a powerful and spirited animal with exceptional endurance, which he also rode during the siege and battles around Fort Donelson and also at Shiloh.

On August 5, 1861, Grant was appointed Brigadier General of volunteers. Soon after he purchased a pony for his son, Frederick Grant, who was with him at the time, along with another horse for field service for himself. At the Battle of Belmont, Grant's first battle in the Civil War, his horse was killed under him where he was compelled to use his son's pony. This horse proved to be unfit for battle, so he turned it over to Captain William S. Hillyer, his aide, when he offered Grant his horse. The Union advance had scattered the Confederates away from Camp Johnston, but the Confederates soon regrouped and began to surround the Union troops. Some officers were considering surrender, but Grant was all about on his horse reassuring and reorganizing his troops. During the final retreat, Grant narrowly escaped on his horse by leading it down a steep riverbank. Grant recalled, "my horse put its fore feet over the bank without hesitation or urging, and, with his hind feet well under him, slid down the bank and trotted aboard the boat, twelve or fifteen feet away, over a single gang-plank."

Grant considered Cincinnati "the finest horse I have ever seen. Grant, on rare occasions, only allowed two other people to ever ride Cincinnati, one of whom was Abraham Lincoln. Of Lincoln, Grant once said, "Lincoln spent the latter days of his life with me. He came to City Point in the last month of the war and was with me all the time. He was a fine horseman and rode my horse Cincinnati every day."

In October 1862, a month before the siege of Vicksburg  got underway, Grant sent his horse Jack to Illinois for a month's rest. During the Vicksburg Campaign Grant acquired another horse captured by a raiding party at a plantation in Mississippi. Grant had the opportunity to ride the animal and found it had a "delightful" gait. Grant purchased the horse from the Army and named it Jeff Davis. He rode it instead of Cincinnati when there was long journeys to be made, because of its surefootedness and ability to stay fresh. Shortly after the Vicksburg campaign, Grant suffered his most serious horse related injury while visiting General Banks in New Orleans. According to Grant's account of the incident, the horse he was using was "vicious and but little used", and while he was reviewing Bank's troops, a locomotive in the street sounded its whistle, causing the horse to take flight. It stumbled and fell upon Grant's leg, causing him to be "rendered insensible", and unconscious. He awoke in a hotel with several doctors looking over him. His leg was swollen from the knee to his thigh. Grant described the pain as "almost beyond endurance". He was bedridden for over a week, unable to even turn over by himself. He was later put upon a steamer and taken back up the Mississippi to Vicksburg where it was some time before he was able to move about on his own.

In December 1863 while still in Chattanooga, Grant was given a fine Kentucky thoroughbred as a gift by the citizens of Egypt, Illinois, organized by Orval Pool, who all knew Grant was in need of a new horse when he had retired Jack, his previous horse. Grant wrote a letter of thanks to the citizens, and named his new gift horse Egypt in their honor. At seven years old, Egypt was an exceptionally handsome dark bay who measured . The horse proved invaluable in the months to come, as Grant traveled over the Cumberland Mountains in January, covered with snow and ice, and was used throughout the Overland Campaign in Virginia.

At the surrender at Appomattox Grant met with General Lee at the picket lines between the armies. There the two generals sat on their horses for hours, Grant astride Cincinnati, and Lee on Traveller, and discussed the terms of surrender and the condition of the South in sight of their soldiers. Before departing Lee requested that his officers be permitted to leave with their horses. Grant, having farmed with horses and knowing many of the Confederate officers were small farmers, allowed them to return home with their horses, swords, and their honor.

Presidency
 
When Grant became president in 1869, three of his horses, Cincinnati, Jeff Davis and Egypt were brought to the White House stables. According to Albert Hawkins, the stable master at the capitol at that time, Grant, during his second term, arranged for a statue of him mounted on Cincinnati. For almost a month the General would have the bridle and saddle put on Cincinnati and ride out to meet the sculptor daily. Hawkins also noted that Grant's other horse, Jeff Davis, was a kicker and had the habit of biting when the stable hands got close to him. Yet Grant, without any trouble was able to handle him the moment he entered the stable. The horse would lay his ears back and move about restlessly until Grant approached him, calming the animal with a few simple pats on the back.

Grant, refusing an offer of $10,000 for Cincinnati, brought the horse with him when he became president and moved to Washington, D.C. In 1878, the horse died at the home of Admiral Ammen. Nearly all depictions of Grant on horseback in drawings, granite, and bronze, are astride Cincinnati, including the Ulysses S. Grant Memorial in Washington, D.C.

After the Civil War Grant had gained possession of White Haven, previously owned by his wife's brother Frederick Tracy Dent. While he was president, Grant transformed the estate into a successful horse breeding farm and designed its large horse stable. Completed in 1871, the stable was large enough to house 25 horses. All Grant's horses were either received as gifts or purchased by Grant. He mostly owned Thoroughbred and Morgan horses, but also enjoyed raising other breeds. Grant would not race his horses, never attended such events, and thought the practice of horse racing for amusement was cruel to the animal.

Grant was once arrested for driving a horse and carriage too fast along M Street in Washington, D.C. The officer, one of Washington's new African-American policemen, was shocked when he discovered who he had detained, but Grant was more impressed than angered and said, "Officer, do your duty", smiled and walked home while the policeman brought the horse and rig to the police station.

World tour
Shortly after his presidency in 1877, Grant and his wife Julia embarked on a tour around the world. In March, the Grants were visiting Constantinople and Greece. While visiting Sultan Abdul Hamid II, Grant was very impressed with his stable of purebred Arabian horses. Grant commented that the stallions would "pick up their feet like a cat, and so quickly, that no one can scarcely follow their motions". Impressed by Grant's praise for the stallions, the Sultan allowed him to pick out any two he desired and take them home. Grant chose a "dappled gray" and an "iron gray", which he had shipped back to New York.

In the spring of 1878, while in Italy, the Grants were touring Milan. Grant was conducting an honorary review of the Bersaglieri, the pride of the Italian Army, who were well known for their horsemanship. At the time Alfred M. Fuller, an ex-Union Captain in the cavalry during the Civil War, happened to be visiting there also. He was well familiar with Grant's horsemanship, which Fuller enthusiastically brought to the attention of the Bersaglieri officers who were accompanying the Grant party. Subsequently, they brought a restless steed to present to Grant which had to be restrained by three other officers. The frantic and powerful animal appeared as if it could break loose at any given moment. Grant approached the young and untamable horse that never had been ridden with astonishment and admiration, while some of the young officers smiled as if they were intentionally setting up Grant with a horse they assumed would throw him off in short order. As Grant slowly mounted the animal, he took hold of the reins and assumed a perfectly erect posture. The horse immediately made several attempts to throw him off and then, unexpectedly, gently trotted forward, knowing that it had met its master. For this, Grant received spontaneous applause. Fuller recalled that at that time, "horse and rider were as one being", as Grant rode the mount for two hours. When Grant returned to the hotel, he looked perfectly relaxed while the officers that oversaw the affair looked completely fatigued.

Funeral

After his prolonged ordeal with throat cancer, while writing his memoirs, Ulysses S. Grant, on July 23, 1885, died at the age of 63. On August 8, his coffin was placed on a catafalque draped in black with plumes at each corner where twenty-four black stallions, arranged in twelve pairs, pulled Grant's hearse along Broadway in New York City, while twenty generals led by General Winfield Scott Hancock, astride a black stallion, led the entourage and team of horses.

See also
 List of horses of the American Civil War
 List of historical horses
 Horses in warfare
 Glossary of equestrian terms
 Bibliography of Ulysses S. Grant

Notes

References

Bibliography

External links
Ulysses S. Grant-collection guide

Ulysses S. Grant
Equestrianism
Horse breeders